Abdul Aleem was a Member of Parliament of Pakistan representing East Bengal.

Early life 
Aleem was born in 1906 in Comilla. He practiced law at the Alipore Court at Calcutta and Calcutta High Court.

Career 
Aleem was elected to parliament from East Pakistan as a Muslim candidate from Bakerganj Sadar.

References 

Pakistani MNAs 1955–1958
1906 births
Year of death missing
People from Comilla District